Linville is a rural town and locality in the Somerset Region, Queensland, Australia.

History
On 19 August 1841, the Balfour brothers - John, Charles and Robert, took up Colinton run which included the present site of the town of Linville.

During their occupancy of Colinton the Balfours built stockyards on the north bank of Greenhide Creek near its junction with the Brisbane River. The yards became known as "Nine Mile Yards". By about 1886 a small private township grew up at the spot and the Nine Mile Receiving Office opened there in 1898. The name was used up till 1901.

Surveyor E.M. Waraker laid out a town at Nine Mile and the plans of sections 2 to 7 of the town, to be known as Linton, were lodged with the Survey office on 6 December 1901. Local residents wanted the name Linton, which was formed by dropping the syllable "Co" from "Colinton". A compromise was reached and at the request of residents the name of the receiving office was changed to Linville in November 1905; it became a post office in January 1910.

In 1910, the Brisbane Valley railway line was extended from Toogoolawah to Linville with Linville railway station serving the town. The railway line closed in 1989.

The railway link allowed the timber industry to develop, with a sawmill opening in 1912 and logging continuing to be an important industry until the 1950s when cattle grazing become the predominant local industry. In 1920 some of the land was allocated to returning soldiers, some of whom setup dairy farms. 

Colinton Provisional School opened on 11 November 1901. In April 1905, it was renamed Oakey Provisional School. In September 1906, it was renamed Linville Provisional School. It became Linville State School in 1909.

St George's Anglican Church was dedicated on Monday 19 April 1915 by Archbishop St Clair Donaldson. It was at 52 David Street. It was sold on 1 June 2020 for $134,200. It was converted into a private residence.

On 1 August 1922, the chairman of the Esk Shire Council, Mr A. Smith, unveiled the Linville War Memorial in George Street; it commemorates those from the district who served in World War I.

On Sunday 1 October 1927, the Linville Methodist Church was opened and dedicated by local minister Reverend Thomas Burgess.

In the  Linville and surrounding districts had a population of 431 people.

On 1 February 2018, Linville's postcode changed from 4306 to 4314.

Heritage listings

Linville has a number of heritage-listed sites, including:
 Linville War Memorial, George Street

Education 
Linville State School is a government primary (Prep-6) school for boys and girls at George Street. In 2018, the school had an enrolment of 28 students with six teachers (three full-time equivalent) and six non-teaching staff (two full-time equivalent).

Economy 
There is a timber mill in Linville.

Amenities 

The town has a general store, the Linville Hotel, and the memorial hall.

There is a free camping area, playground, bbq's and toilets.

Attractions 
The old railway station and carriages are in the centre of the town.

The  Brisbane Valley Rail Trail passes through the town of Linville; it is Australia's longest rail trail for hiking, cycling and horse riding.

The Linville War Memorial is in George Street.

References

Further reading

External links

 
 Brisbane Valley Heritage Trails: Linville

Towns in Queensland
Suburbs of Somerset Region
Localities in Queensland